KiXtart is a closed source free-format scripting language for Windows. It is described as a logon script processor and enhanced batch scripting language by the official website. Its name is a portmanteau of "kick start".

Overview
KiXtart is developed by Ruud van Velsen of Microsoft Netherlands. It is now provided as careware. Development started in 1991 to provide login scripting for the Microsoft LAN Manager environment.

It has rich built-in functionality for easy scripting and provides access to ADSI, ADO, WMI, etc. The language can be used to display information, set environment variables, start programs, connect to network drives, read or edit the registry, change the current drive and directory, and much more.

With KiXforms, the user can create a GUI for KiXtart.

Code example
Read the Windows product ID
; Read value from registry
$ProductID = ReadValue("HKEY_LOCAL_MACHINE\Software\Microsoft\Windows NT\CurrentVersion","ProductId")

; Display result or error message
If @ERROR = 0
    ? "ProductID=$ProductID"
Else
    ? "Error reading product ID"
Endif
?

; Done
Exit @ERROR

Versions
Development of KiXtart as a logon scripting language started in 1991. Later versions were released on these dates:
3.63  23 October 2000
KiXtart 2001
4.00  19 November 2001
4.02  21 January 2002
4.10  8 July 2002
4.11  26 August 2002
4.12  11 November 2002
4.20  17 February 2003
4.21  15 July 2003
4.22  14 November 2003
4.23  31 December 2004
KiXtart 2010
4.50  1 July 2005
4.51  6 October 2005
4.52  21 July 2006
4.53  15 September 2006
4.60  3 October 2007
4.61  24 September 2009
4.62  12 August 2011
4.63  4 September 2012
4.64  25 February 2014
4.66  24 July 2015
4.67  10 October 2016

Books
Kelly, Bob. Start to Finish Guide to Scripting with KiXtart  / Bob Kelly. Greenland, NH : Agility Press, 2004. 
Jesse M. Torres. Windows Admin Scripting Little Black Book, 3rd Edition  / Jesse M. Torres. Paraglyph Press, 2006.

See also
AutoHotKey
AutoIt
AutoKey (for Linux)
Automator (for Macintosh)
Automise
Bookmarklet
FastTrack Scripting Host
iMacros for Firefox
Macro Express
Winbatch

References

External links
KiXtart.org
KiXforms.org

Proprietary software
Scripting languages